Chariton (Greek: Χαρίτων) is a name of Byzantine Greek origin (see Chariton the Confessor) meaning well-affected, benevolent.

In modern times is used as both as given name and family name, it several spellings, depending on the language, including Hariton, Charyton, Khariton. The feminine form is (variously transliterated) Charitina/Haritina/Kharitina.

Chariton may also have a French origin, variously spelled Charaton, Thieraton, Charretin. 'Charaton' may itself be a corruption of Charleton or Charlatan.

References

Given names of Greek language origin